Bolshiye Kizeli is a rural locality (a village) in Petropavlovskoye Rural Settlement, Bolshesosnovsky District, Perm Krai, Russia. The population was 45 as of 2010. There are 2 streets.

Geography 
Bolshiye Kizeli is located 25 km northwest of Bolshaya Sosnova, the district's administrative centre, by road. Petropavlovsk is the nearest rural locality.

References 

Rural localities in Bolshesosnovsky District